Vono, also known as Kiwollo (Kiballo), is a nearly extinct Kainji language of Nigeria.

References

East Kainji languages
Languages of Nigeria
Endangered Niger–Congo languages